Gabriele Pin (born 21 January 1962) is an Italian football coach, and a former player. He is currently an assistant coach at Al-Ittihad Kalba.

Pin became a coach after a long professional career as a midfielder. As a player, he won the Scudetto and Intercontinental Cup with Juventus and the UEFA Cup Winners' Cup, the UEFA Cup and the UEFA Super Cup with Parma. As a coach he has served as assistant to Cesare Prandelli in the latter's stints as manager.
He also be runners Up of Euro 2012 with Italy national team as assistant and be winner of UEFA Cup and winner of UEFA Super Cup at his player carrier with Parma and much times win series A with Juventus. On 6 September 2021, he joined Esteghlal coaching staff.

References 

https://www.tehrantimes.com/news/461587/Italian-coach-Gabriele-Pin-to-join-Esteghlal-coaching-staff

External links 
 

1962 births
Living people
People from Vittorio Veneto
Sportspeople from the Province of Treviso
Footballers from Veneto
Italian footballers
Association football midfielders
Juventus F.C. players
Forlì F.C. players
Parma Calcio 1913 players
S.S. Lazio players
Piacenza Calcio 1919 players
S.S.D. Sanremese Calcio players
Serie A players
Serie B players
Serie C players
UEFA Cup winning players
Association football coaches
ACF Fiorentina non-playing staff
Italy national football team non-playing staff
Galatasaray S.K. (football) non-playing staff
Valencia CF non-playing staff